Conrad Bloom is an American television sitcom television series created by Caroline in the City producer Marco Pennette, that aired on NBC from September 21, 1998, to December 21, 1998, and running for 15 episodes.

The series was cancelled after nine episodes for the low ratings, however co-stars Mark Feuerstein and Linda Lavin would later reunite for the CBS series 9JKL, which debuted in 2017.

Premise
The show is centered around Conrad Bloom, a copywriter in New York City, looking for love whilst trying to pursue his career. Conrad has to deal with the women in his life: A mother, a sister, an ex-girlfriend still harboring feelings for him, a boss and a co-worker. Conrad balances work, life, friends and family whilst trying to remember that love is out there.

Cast
Mark Feuerstein as Conrad Bloom
Lauren Graham as Molly Davenport
Jessica Stone as Shelly
Paula Newsome as Faye Reynolds
Steve Landesberg as George Dorsey
Linda Lavin as Florie Bloom
Ever Carradine as Nina Bloom

Episodes

External links

1990s American sitcoms
1998 American television series debuts
1998 American television series endings
English-language television shows
NBC original programming
Television shows set in New York City
Television series by Universal Television